S v Mhlungu and Others is a decision of the Constitutional Court of South Africa in which the court interpreted a transitional provision in the Interim Constitution of South Africa relating to the handling of criminal cases that were pending when that constitution came into force on 27 April 1994. The ruling, handed down on 8 June 1995, held that such cases were subject to the human rights protections in Chapter 3 of the Interim Constitution despite a clause appearing to exclude them.

References

External links
 Text of the judgment

Constitutional Court of South Africa cases
South African criminal case law
1995 in South African law
1995 in case law